Azepindole (McN-2453) is a tricyclic compound with antidepressant and antihypertensive effects that was developed in the late 1960s but was never marketed.

See also 
 Tricyclic antidepressant

References 

Tricyclic antidepressants
Diazepines
Indoles
Abandoned drugs